Yannick Martinez (born 4 May 1988 in Fourchambault) is a French road and cyclo-cross cyclist, who currently rides for French amateur team Guidon Chalettois. He is the younger brother of 2000 Olympic cross-country mountain biking champion Miguel Martinez, the son of Mariano Martínez, and the uncle of Lenny Martinez.

Major results

2009
 1st Val d'Ille Classic
 5th Road race, UEC European Under-23 Road Championships
2011
 6th Tour de la Somme
2012
 8th Overall Tour of Taihu Lake
 8th Tour du Doubs
 9th Grand Prix d'Isbergues
 9th Paris–Bourges
2013
 1st Stage 5 Four Days of Dunkirk
 1st Stage 1 Route du Sud
 2nd Boucles de l'Aulne
 3rd RideLondon–Surrey Classic
 5th Overall Tour du Limousin
 5th Grand Prix de Plumelec-Morbihan
 6th Overall Tour of Taihu Lake
 6th Grand Prix d'Isbergues
 7th Tour de Vendée
 8th Polynormande
 10th Tour du Finistère
2014
 3rd Tour de la Somme
 5th La Roue Tourangelle
 8th Overall Four Days of Dunkirk
 9th Scheldeprijs
 10th Boucles de l'Aulne
2017
 7th La Roue Tourangelle

References

External links

1988 births
Living people
French male cyclists